The Legend of Hallowaiian (also known as Hallowaiian: Adventure Hawaii, and Halloween Island) is a 2018 Canadian computer-animated adventure comedy film directed by Sean O'Reilly. It was released on DirecTV on September 20, 2018, followed by limited theatrical release in October.

The film was produced by King's Hawaiian's newly formed production company Fresh Baked Films, SC Films International and Arcana Studio.

Plot 
Terror arises on the Big Island of Hawaii. Three young friends try to restore peace to their home, after accidentally releasing a mythical monster on Halloween. They must use their wits and courage, and will learn the importance of family, friends and culture.

Cast 

Vanessa Williams - Fire Goddess
Tia Carrere - Nana
Mark Dacascos - Pono
Teilor Grubbs - Leilani
Noah Schnapp - Kai
Mark Hamill - Officer Duke
Keifer O'Reilly - Eddie
Page Feldman - Marge
Sean Patrick O'Reilly - Mr. Griffith/Menehune
Erick Dickens - Tom
Dumi Owane - Teenage Girl

Reception 
Bobby LePire from Film Threat considered that the film is: ... "cute and offers younger viewers a fun and important message....however, the lack of detail in the backgrounds hurt the atmosphere the screenplay attempts to create."

Common Sense Media reviewed the film, stating: ... "This movie tells a simple and fairly satisfying story that will probably be absorbing for younger kids."

Lavanya from Red Carpet Crash depicts the film  as "The movie succeeds in depicting the island in a beautiful way, taking the audience right to the ocean and breathtaking natural elements of Hawaii."

References

External links 

2018 animated films
2018 films
Canadian children's fantasy films
2010s children's fantasy films
Films directed by Sean Patrick O'Reilly
2010s English-language films
2010s Canadian films